Donald Johnson and Jared Palmer were declared the winners of the gentlemen's invitation doubles tennis title at the 2008 Wimbledon Championships after defending champions Jacco Eltingh and Paul Haarhuis withdrew from the final.

Draw

Final

Group A
Standings are determined by: 1. number of wins; 2. number of matches; 3. in two-players-ties, head-to-head records; 4. in three-players-ties, percentage of sets won, or of games won; 5. steering-committee decision.

Group B
Standings are determined by: 1. number of wins; 2. number of matches; 3. in two-players-ties, head-to-head records; 4. in three-players-ties, percentage of sets won, or of games won; 5. steering-committee decision.

External links
Draw

Men's Invitation Doubles